Andragius was a legendary king of the Britons as accounted by Geoffrey of Monmouth.  He was the youngest son of King Cherin and succeeded by his son Urianus.

References

Legendary British kings
2nd-century BC legendary rulers